Khairatabad Ganesh is an idol of the Hindu god Ganesha (known as "Ganesh" in Hindi) that is installed during the annual festival of Ganesh Chaturthi at Khairatabad locality of Hyderabad, India. Constructed annually and known for its height and the laddu held in the figure's hand, the idol is worshipped during the 10-day festival where thousands of devotees visit every day. On the 11th day, the idol is immersed in the nearby Hussain Sagar lake.

Inspired by Bal Gangadhar Tilak, Singari Shankaraiah first established a  Ganesh idol in 1954 at a temple in Khairatabad. The height of the constructed idol increased by one foot every year until 2014, where it reached . The size was later reduced owing to the limitations of the route to Hussain Sagar lake and environmental concerns.

Origins 
It was started by Singari Shankaraiah, Indian independence movement activist and former corporator, who was inspired by Bal Gangadhar Tilak's call in 1893 to celebrate the festival as a mark of unity.

Devotees participate in the 10-day festival where thousands of people visit the Khairatabad Ganesh every day from various parts of the city, and other places. On the 11th day, the idol is immersed in the nearby Hussain Sagar lake.

Chinnaswamy Rajendran, who previously worked in film set designing in South Indian cinema, has been the chief architect and supervising the design of the idol since 1978. In 1978, the organizers had commissioned a backup idol to be built at Dhoolpet, a neighbourhood in Hyderabad, had Chinnaswamy unable to deliver. The idol has been placed outside the temple since 1978.

Height 
The height of the idol constructed increased one foot every year since 1954 until 2014 where it reached . In 2019, the height was increased to  due to requests from the devotees.

Laddu 
The Khairatabad Ganesh is also known for its laddu, offered as prasadam. Until 2009, the Khiaratabad Ganesh Utsav committee used to place a 50 kg laddu at the pandal. Starting from 2010 until 2015, the laddu was offered by PVVS Mallikarjun Rao a.k.a. Malli Babu, who is a sweet maker from Tapeswaram, a village located in East Godavari district of Andhra Pradesh. It was made in Tapeswaram and transported to the idol location at Khairatabad, and came to be known as Tapeswaram laddu. Rao donated a laddu weighing 500 kg in 2010, which gradually increased to 6000 kg in 2015. This is the heaviest laddu offered in the idol's history.

In 2016, the Utsav committee asked Rao to reduce the laddu weight to 600 kg, citing the distribution of large laddu to devotees as a problem. Later, Rao announced that he would not be donating laddu any further to Khairatabad, alleging that the committee had breached their contract by placing the laddu at the feet of Ganesha instead of placing it in hands as agreed before. The same year, Rao entered the Guinness World Records by creating a laddu weighing 29,465 kg which was presented to a Ganesh idol at Visakhapatnam.

Since 2016, the laddu is presented by J. Tanay Rana and his family who run an air-cooler business in Hyderabad. The presented laddu, which weighed 62 kg in 2016, reached 1,100 kg in 2021.

Once the puja ceremony is completed, the laddu is distributed to the devotees, ranging between 2,000 and 3,000 every year. In 2015, overcrowding led to an almost stampede situation. The police were unable to control the crowd due to broken barricades and had to stop the distribution in the middle.

Contemporary ceremonies 
In 2013, a  Ganesh idol was installed with the Tapeswaram laddu weighing about 4000 kg was kept in the palm. However, the laddu was damaged due to rainfall and had to be immersed in the Hussain Sagar lake.

In 2014, the height of the Ganesh reached , celebrating 60 years of its formation. In 2018, a 57-feet tall idol was constructed at the cost of 80 lakh. 35 tonnes of Plaster-of-Paris (PoP), 22 tonnes of steel, 15 tonnes of clay and 500 litres of paint were used for the construction.

The 2019 Ganesh idol was the tallest idol at Khairtabad. It was also the tallest Ganesh idol in India that year.

Devotees, however, continued to visit the idol despite restrictions. The organizers commissioned a turban to be designed by experts who designed turbans for the film franchise Baahubali. The immersion event of the idol witnessed devotees ignoring COVID-19 preventive measures.

Immersion 

The Khairatabad Ganesh, along with several thousand other idols in the city, are immersed in the Hussain Sagar lake on the last day of the festivities. The idol is taken on a shobha yatra, an immersion procession rally in the city. Massive trolley pulls up the idol with the help of advanced cranes from Khairtabad to Hussain Sagar. The Khairatabad Ganesh idol is taken on a direct route to the lake at Tank Bund Road, while other idols are taken in a longer procession route around the city. Once the idol reaches the lake, cranes, fitted with specialized equipment in the recent years, lift up the idol and immerse it in the lake.

The Hyderabad City Police impose preemptive traffic sanctions along the procession route. In the recent years, the police has started using technology like Google Maps to monitor the traffic. Since the construction of Hyderabad Metro in the late 2010s, the procession route had to be avoided along the railway route so as to prevent collision of the idols with the metro stations.

List of idols 

Each year, the committee chooses a different avatar for the idol.

Environmental concerns 
In 2017, E. S. L. Narasimhan, the governor of Telangana called for construction of the Khairtabad Ganesh idol using clay and natural colours instead of the usual Plaster-of-Paris (PoP). However, the organizing Ganesh Utsav Committee expressed concerns over the clay idol as it could be damaged due to heavy rains and the plan was eventually dropped.

In September 2021, the Telangana High Court issued a ban on immersing the Ganesh idols made out of Plaster-of-Paris (PoP) in the Hussain Sagar lake due to environmental concerns. The verdict had put immersion of the 40-feet Khairtabad Ganesh in a state of limbo. The governing body of the city, Greater Hyderabad Municipal Corporation (GHMC), sought a stay order from the Supreme Court of India. The court allowed the immersion for the last time with an undertaking that there would be no immersion of PoP idols from the following year. Following the exemption, GHMC dug up Hussain Sagar lake, for the first time, along the shore on NTR Marg so that the idol would be fully immersed in accordance to religious beliefs.

During the same time, the organizing committee announced their plans to build a  eco-friendly Ganesh idol made out of clay in 2022, following the request by the mayor of Hyderabad. The committee also stated that they would explore the idea of immersing the idol at the site itself, instead of taking it to the Hussain Sagar lake.

Popular culture 
Khairatabad Ganesh was featured in the K. Viswanath-directed 1983 film Sagara Sangamam where Kamal Haasan's dance sequences were shot in front of the idol.

Notes

References

External links 

 

Hinduism in India
Religion in Hyderabad, India
Ganesha temples